The Malawian ambassador in Washington, D. C. is the official representative of the Government in Lilongwe to the Government of the United States.  The Ambassador to the United States also serves concurrently as the non-resident High Commissioner to Canada, High Commissioner to the Bahamas, Ambassador to Cuba, and Ambassador to Mexico.

List of representatives

References 

 
United States
Malawi